The 2015 German motorcycle Grand Prix was the ninth round of the 2015 Grand Prix motorcycle racing season. It was held at the Sachsenring in Hohenstein-Ernstthal on 12 July 2015.

In the MotoGP class, Marc Márquez secured his fourth pole position of the season, and ultimately took his second victory of the season — his sixth successive wins from pole position at Sachsenring, ahead from his teammate Dani Pedrosa and Valentino Rossi, who finished in third place. Scott Redding and Andrea Dovizioso crashed out from the race before the halfway mark. Hiroshi Aoyama, who previously replace Pedrosa at Repsol Honda Team — replaced an injured Karel Abraham, also crashed out from the race. Mike Di Meglio and Claudio Corti, who replaced an injured Stefan Bradl, force to retire from the race. Eugene Laverty's older brother, Michael Laverty return to MotoGP race as he replaced Marco Melandri as Melandri left Aprilia Racing Team Gresini after he failing to score any point after the first eight races. With this result, Rossi continue leading his championshionship over 13 points from Jorge Lorenzo.

Classification

MotoGP

Moto2

Moto3

Championship standings after the race (MotoGP)
Below are the standings for the top seven riders and constructors after round nine has concluded.

Riders' Championship standings

Constructors' Championship standings

Teams' Championship standings

 Note: Only the top seven positions are included for both sets of standings.

References

German
Motorcycle Grand Prix
German motorcycle Grand Prix
German motorcycle Grand Prix